Lione is both an Italian surname and a given name. Notable people with the name include:

Fabio Lione (born 1973), Italian singer
Riccardo Lione (born 1972), Italian beach volleyball player
Lione Pascoli (1674–1744), Italian abbot, art historian, collector and economist

Italian-language surnames